This is a list of events that happened in 1943 in Greece.

Incumbents
Monarch: George II
Prime Minister: Emmanouil Tsouderos

Events
16–17 February – Domenikon massacre by the Italian Army.
7 April – Konstantinos Logothetopoulos is dismissed as collaborationist Prime Minister and is succeeded by Ioannis Rallis.
14 May – The forces of EAM-ELAS attack the EKKA's 5/42 Regiment.
23 June – The forces of EAM-ELAS attack the EKKA's 5/42 Regiment and forcibly dissolve it.
5 July – The main Greek resistance groups conclude the National Bands Agreement.
12 August – Massacre of Kommeno by the German Army.
8 September – The Italian garrison on Kastellorizo surrenders to the Allies.
8 September – Jürgen Stroop becomes the country's HSSPF.
9–11 September – The Germans under Ulrich Kleemann seize Rhodes from the Italians.
14–16 September – Viannos massacres by the German Army.
15–24 September – Massacre of the Acqui Division on the island of Cephalonia by the German Army.
19–29 September – The Paramythia executions by the German Army and local Albanian collaborators.
3–4 October – Battle of Kos: the Germans capture the island of Kos against British and Italian resistance.
9 November – Walter Schimana becomes the country's HSSPF.
12–16 November – Battle of Leros: the Germans capture the island of Leros against British and Italian resistance.
13 December 1943 – Massacre of Kalavryta by the German Army.
14 December – 300 Allied bomber raid Athens.
15 December – Allied bombers raid Piraeus harbor and Greek airfields.
18 December – Drakeia massacre by the SS.

Births
28 May - Elena Souliotis, operatic soprano (d. 2004)

References 

 
Greece
Years of the 20th century in Greece